Stairway to Hell is a 2012 EP by Ugly Kid Joe

Books
Stairway to Hell, novel by Charlie Williams 2009
Stairway to Hell: The 500 Best Heavy Metal Albums in the Universe, by Chuck Eddy 1998

Film and TV
Stairway to Hell, 2004  Season 1  Episode 4,551 from Neighbours
Stairway to Hell, 2011 Season 2  Episode 4 from  The Devil You Know (TV series) 
Stairway to Hell, 2013 Season 1 Episode 1 from Mountain Movers
Stairway to Hell, 2019 Season 1 Episode 12 of Disenchantment

Music
"Stairway To Hell/Sex Is No Emergency", single by Monte Cazazza 1982
"Stairway To Hell", song by The Amity Affliction from Severed Ties
Stairway to Hell Tour 2009, The Amity Affliction
"Stairway to Hell", single by Alan Mair 2015
"Stairway to Hell" (地獄への階段, Jigoku he no Kaidan?) 1987 from Seikima-II discography

Other
Stairway to Hell Match, type of wrestling match